Clareification is the weekly student newsletter of Clare College, a college of the University of Cambridge.  Named as a pun on the college's name, it was padded out with comedy articles, gradually turning into a weekly or fortnightly comedy paper.  The paper is produced by editor(s) elected each year by the student body.

In 2005, it won the 'Best College Paper' award in The Cambridge Student.

Controversy 

In 2007, in a guest-edited edition devoted to religious satire, entitled Crucification, the magazine re-printed one of the Danish Muhammad cartoons which provoked an international incident when they were originally published 15 months earlier.

The guest editor was taken into hiding due to the threat of violent reprisals .  The college's former senior tutor, Dr Patricia Fara, issued a statement saying, "The college finds the publication and the views expressed abhorrent." The college called a Court of Discipline to judge the student and suspended the newsletter's funding. The Cambridge Evening News described the issue as "racist" , in an article in which an "insider" suggested that the magazine might constitute "racial incitement". Two students were subsequently interviewed under caution by police in connection with the issue. 

Following the incident, the Union of Clare Students Executive independently published two further issues, predominantly devoted to satirising the coverage of the controversy. A new editor was elected the following academic year.

External links
A summary of the controversial issue and the ensuing controversy on Harrys Place blog.

The offending pages on  Pub Philosopher blog.

Critical analysis of the controversy in The Berry, Spiked Online, New Statesman, The Observer and Guardian Unlimited.

Home page 

Publications associated with the University of Cambridge
Student newspapers published in the United Kingdom